Pseudodissochaeta is a genus of flowering plants belonging to the family Melastomataceae.

Its native range is Eastern Himalaya to Southern China and Indo-China.

Species:

Pseudodissochaeta assamica 
Pseudodissochaeta lanceata 
Pseudodissochaeta raphioides 
Pseudodissochaeta septentrionalis 
Pseudodissochaeta spirei 
Pseudodissochaeta subsessilis

References

Melastomataceae
Melastomataceae genera